is a Japanese manga series written and illustrated by Tsubasa Fukuchi. It was serialized in Shogakukan's Weekly Shōnen Sunday from October 2011 to January 2014, with its chapters collected in five tankōbon volumes published by Shogakukan.

Manga
Anagle Mole is written and illustrated by Tsubasa Fukuchi. It began in the 2011 47th issue of Shogakukan's shōnen manga magazine Weekly Shōnen Sunday on October 19, 2011. Fukuchi put the manga on hiatus due to health issues after the 33rd chapter, published in the 2012 33rd issue of the magazine in September 2012. The manga resumed publication in the 2013 44th issue of Weekly Shōnen Sunday, released on October 2, 2013. The series finished in the 2018 6th issue of the magazine, released on January 8, 2014. The series was collected into five tankōbon volumes published by Shogakukan, from March 16, 2012, to February 18, 2014.

Volume list

References

External links
Official website at Web Sunday 

Action anime and manga
Comedy anime and manga
Shogakukan manga
Shōnen manga